Lemoine or Le Moine is a French surname meaning "Monk". Notable people with the surname include:

 Adolphe Lemoine, known as Lemoine-Montigny (1812–1880), French comic-actor
 Anna Le Moine (born 1973), Swedish curler
 Antoine Marcel Lemoine (1763–1817) musician, music publisher, father to Henry
 Benjamin-Henri Le Moine (1811–1875), Canadian politician and banker
 C.W. Lemoine, US author
 Claude Lemoine (born 1932), French chess master and journalist
 Cyril Lemoine (born 1983), French cyclist
 Émile Lemoine (1840–1912), French geometrician
 Henri Lemoine (cyclist) (1909–1981), French cyclist
 Henri Lemoine (fraudster) (fl. 1902–1908), French fraudster
 Henry Lemoine (1786–1854), Piano teacher, music publisher, composer
 Jacques-Antoine-Marie Lemoine (1751–1824), also Lemoyne, French painter
 Jake Lemoine (born 1993), American baseball player
 James MacPherson Le Moine (1825–1912), Canadian writer, lawyer and historian 
 Jean Lemoine (1250–1313), French canon lawyer, cardinal, bishop and papal legate
 Jean-Luc Lemoine (born 1970), French comedian and TV presenter
 Jim LeMoine (born 1945), American football player
 Jordy Lemoine (born 1988), French singer
 Louis Lemoine (1764–1842), French general of the French Revolutionary Wars
 Marie-Victoire Lemoine (1754–1820), French painter
 Nick Lemoine (born 1957), British academic
 Pablo Lemoine (born 1975), Uruguayan rugby union player
 Patricia Lemoine (born 1961), French politician
 Pierre Le Moine (born 1927), French activist and architect
 Pierre-Antoine Lemoine (1605–1665), French painter
 Pierre Camille Le Moine (1723–1800), French archivist
 Rebecka Le Moine (born 1990), Swedish politician
 René Lemoine (1905-1995), French Olympic fencer
 Roger Le Moine (1933–2004), Canadian professor of literature, and literary critic
 Victor Lemoine (1823–1911), French horticulturist
 Virginie Lemoine, French humourist, comedian and actor
 Yvan Lemoine (born 1981), chef and author

See also
 Lemoine point, the intersection of the symmedians of a triangle
 Cardinal Lemoine (Paris Métro), a station on line 10 du métro de Paris
 Le Moine, a mountain of the Pennine Alps, in Switzerland
 Lemoyne (disambiguation)
 Lemoine River, tributary of Rivière Pot au Beurre, Montérégie, Quebec, Canada

French-language surnames